Radio Payam is a radio station in Iran. The name means "message radio" in Persian. It is a state owned radio station in Iran that mainly has music, traffic and general news.

External links
 

Islamic Republic of Iran Broadcasting
Persian-language radio stations
Government of Iran
Radio stations in Iran